Cahill Racing was an Indy Racing League IndyCar Series team owned by Iowa businessman Larry Cahill. The team initially was active from 1998 to 2002. From 1999 to 2000 the team was sponsored by Big Daddy's BBQ Sauce, a company with a history of failing to complete the commitments of their auto racing sponsorship contracts. However, the team was able to continue until 2002, the last season before large cost increases of the 2003 season brought by the former CART engine manufacturers and teams. The team's best finish during that time was a third place at the 2000 Phoenix International Raceway race by Donnie Beechler.

On December 16, 2006, Cahill announced that the team would be restarted for the 2007 season, with Venezuelan female driver Milka Duno confirmed in the first car. It was also announced that the team was trying to finalize a deal to race American sprint car driver Jeff Mitrisin in a second car. However, the deal apparently fell through and Cahill did not enter any IndyCar series races in 2007. Duno went on to drive for SAMAX Motorsport that season.

Past drivers
 Donnie Beechler (1998-2000)
 Robby McGehee (2001-2002)
 Jack Miller (2001)

Complete IRL IndyCar Series results
(key) (Results in bold indicate pole position; results in italics indicate fastest lap)

 The 1999 VisionAire 500K at Charlotte was cancelled after 79 laps due to spectator fatalities.

IndyCar Series teams
American auto racing teams